Jacobaea maritima, commonly known as silver ragwort, is a perennial plant species in the genus Jacobaea in the family Asteraceae, native to the Mediterranean region. It was formerly placed in the genus Senecio, and is still widely referred to as Senecio cineraria; see the list of synonyms (right) for other names.

It is widely cultivated as an ornamental plant for its white, felt-like tomentose leaves; in horticultural use, it is also sometimes called dusty miller, a name shared with several other plants that also have silvery tomentose leaves, including Centaurea cineraria and Silene coronaria.

Description

The stems are stiff and woody at the base, densely branched, and covered in long, matted grey-white to white hairs.

The tomentum is thickest on the underside of the leaves, and can become worn off on the upper side, leaving the top surface glabrous with age. The flowers are yellow, daisy-like in dense capitula  in diameter, with central disc florets surrounded by a ring of 10–13 ray florets, and enclosed in a common whorl of bracts at the base of the capitulum. The seeds are cylindrical achenes.

Distribution
Jacobaea maritima is native to the western and central Mediterranean region, in northwest Africa (Morocco, northern Algeria, Tunisia), southern Europe (Spain, Gibraltar, southern France including Corsica, Italy including Sardinia and Sicily, Malta, Slovenia, Croatia, Bosnia and Herzegovina, Kosovo, Albania, Montenegro, Serbia, Macedonia, and Greece), and the far west of Asia (Turkey). It occurs primarily on cliffs and rocky coastal sites, more rarely inland.

It is also naturalised further north in Europe (north to Great Britain and Ireland, where occurring mainly in mild coastal areas) and locally in North America.

Ecology
As with many other densely tomentose plants, the tomentum, or hair-like pieces on the stems and leaves, is used by some species of bees (e.g. Anthidium manicatum and Anthidium oblongatum in Megachilidae) for nest-building.

Hybrids are known as Jacobaea erucifolia and Jacobaea vulgaris. The J. vulgaris variant is fertile producing a wide range of intermediate progeny.

Cultivation and uses

Jacobaea maritima is widely used in horticulture for its silvery foliage. It is winter-hardy in USDA Zones 8-10, tolerating winter temperatures down to -12° to -15 °C, tolerant of light shade but preferring full sun. In colder areas it is grown as an annual plant. Many cultivars have been selected for particularly dense silvery tomentum, such as 'Cirrus', 'New Look', 'Ramparts', 'Silverdust', 'Silver Filigree', and 'White Diamond'. It has been recommended in North America for its fire resistance resistance to browsing by deer, and its salt tolerance.

The cultivar 'Silver Dust' has gained the Royal Horticultural Society's Award of Garden Merit.

Confusion in the horticultural trade exists between J. maritima and Centaurea cineraria, which has resulted in confusion regarding which cultivars pertain to either species, which has also resulted in much confusion in photographs of these species on the internet.

References

maritima
Plants described in 1753
Taxa named by Carl Linnaeus
Flora of Malta